DataCite is an international not-for-profit organization which aims to improve data citation in order to:
establish easier access to research data on the Internet
increase acceptance of research data as legitimate, citable contributions to the scholarly record
support data archiving that will permit results to be verified and re-purposed for future study.

Background
In August 2009 a paper was published laying out an approach for a global registration agency for research data. DataCite was subsequently founded in London on 1 December 2009 by organisations from 6 countries: the British Library; the Technical Information Center of Denmark (DTIC); the TU Delft Library from the Netherlands; the National Research Council’s Canada Institute for Scientific and Technical Information (NRC-CISTI); the California Digital Library (University of California Curation Center - UC3); Purdue University (USA); and the German National Library of Science and Technology (TIB).

After the founding of DataCite, leading research libraries and information centres converged for the first official members’ convention in Paris on 5 February 2010. The inclusion of five further members was approved in the office of the International Council for Science (ICSU): Australian National Data Service (ANDS); Deutsche Zentralbibliothek für Medizin (ZB MED); GESIS – Leibniz Institute for the Social Sciences; French Institute for Scientific and Technical Information (INIST); and Eidgenössische Technische Hochschule (ETH) Zürich.

Technical 

The primary means of establishing easier access to research data is by DataCite members assigning persistent identifiers, such as digital object identifiers (DOIs), to data sets. Although currently leveraging the well-established DOI infrastructure, DataCite takes an open approach to identifiers, and considers other systems and services that help forward its objectives. 

DataCite's recommended format for a data citation is: 
Creator (PublicationYear): Title. Publisher. Identifier
Or alternatively:
Creator (PublicationYear): Title. Version. Publisher. ResourceType. Identifier

DataCite recommends that DOI names are displayed as linkable, permanent URLs.

Third-party tools allow the migration of content to and from other services such as ODIN, for ORCID

Members
Source:

 Australia:
 Australian National Data Service - ANDS
 Canada:
 National Research Council Canada - NRC-CNRC
 China:
 Beijing Genomics Institute - BGI 
 Denmark:
 Danish e-Infrastructure Cooperation - DeiC
 Estonia:
 University of Tartu (/UT)
 Finland:
 CSC – IT Center for Science - CSC
 France:
 Institut de l'information scientifique et technique - INIST-CNRS
 Germany:
German National Library of Economics - ZBW
 German National Library of Medicine - ZB MED
 German National Library of Science and Technology - TIB
 Leibniz Institute for the Social Sciences - GESIS
 Göttingen State and University Library - SUB
 Gesellschaft für wissenschaftliche Datenverarbeitung mbH Göttingen - GWDG
 Hungary:
 Library and Information Centre, Hungarian Academy of Sciences - MTA KIK
 International:
 ICSU World Data System - ICSU-WDS 
 Italy:
 Conference of Italian University Rectors - CRUI
 Japan:
 Japan Link Center - JaLC
 Netherlands:
 TU Delft Library
 Norway:
 BIBSYS
 Republic of Korea:
 Korea Institute of Science and Technology Information - KISTI 
 Russia
 Cyberleninka
 Russian Agency for Digital Standardization
 South Africa:
 South African Environmental Observation Network - SAEON
 Sweden:
 Swedish National Data Service - SND
 Switzerland:
 CERN - European Organization for Nuclear Research
 Swiss Federal Institute of Technology Zurich - ETH
 Thailand:
 National Research Council of Thailand - NRCT
 United Kingdom:
 The British Library - BL
 Digital Curation Centre 
 United States:
California Digital Library - CDL
 Office of Scientific and Technical Information, US Department of Energy - OSTI
 Purdue University Libraries - PUL
 Inter-university Consortium for Political and Social Research - ICPSR 
 Harvard University Library 
 Institute of Electrical and Electronics Engineers - IEEE
 Open Knowledgebase of Interatomic Models - KIM
 United States Geological Survey - USGS
 University of Southern California - USC

Other partners 

In April 2017, DataCite was one of the founding partners in the Initiative for Open Citations.  In January 2023, DataCite announced a partnering with the Chan Zuckerberg Initiative to develop an Open Global Data Citation Corpus.

References

External links 
 Official DataCite website

Academic publishing
Data publishing
Electronic documents
Identifiers
Index (publishing)
Library-related organizations
Non-profit technology